Andrew Coughlin (born 31 January 1993) is an English footballer who plays as a goalkeeper for Colwyn Bay in the Cymru North.

Career

Tranmere Rovers
Coughlin was born in Bootle, England. He started his career in the Centre of Excellence of Tranmere Rovers at the age of 15 and signed a two-year apprenticeship in the summer of 2009. In April 2010, Coughlin was an unused substitute for the 3–1 win over Exeter City. In April 2011, Coughlin signed his first professional contract, on a one-year deal. On 21 April 2012, Coughlin made his professional debut in a 1–1 draw with Hartlepool United. He was released at the end of the 2011–12 season.

Fleetwood Town (loan)
In November 2010, he was sent on loan to Conference side Fleetwood Town on work experience terms. Coughlin was signed to act as back up to Scott Davies whilst regular second choice goalkeeper Danny Hurst was out injured. In his loan spell Coughlin did not make an appearance for the Highbury club.

Wrexham
On 3 July 2012, he joined Welsh club Wrexham on trial, before signing a one-year deal on 23 July. Coughlin was involved in pre-season matches against Welsh Premier side's Aberystwyth Town and Bala Town as well as Kilmarnock and Coventry City. Coughlin made his debut for Wrexham in a 3–2 win against Stockport County at Edgeley Park on 10 October, this was due to first choice 'keeper Joslain Mayebi being away on international duty with Cameroon. Coughlin played his first home league match in a 4–2 defeat to Lincoln City at the Racecourse Ground. After a season as second choice and making just eight appearances, Coughlin extended his deal in the summer of 2013 meaning his contract would end at the end of the 2013/2014 season. In a season where he looked to challenge first team goalkeeper Joslain Mayebi, it took just two months, as a string of Mayebi mistakes handed Coughlin the number one spot, which he kept and played well, earning the praises of the Wrexham fans throughout the season.

He subsequently joined Southport for the 2015–2016 season, before spending the 2016–17 season with Barrow.

Airbus UK Broughton
In the summer of 2017, Coughlin signed for Airbus UK Broughton in the Huws Gray Alliance, making twenty league appearances in his only season. In July 2018, Coughlin moved on to recently relegated Bangor City, before moving on to Colwyn Bay that September.

International career
Coughlin was called up to the England C team in February 2014 by England C and Chester manager Steve Burr. He made his debut against Jordan U23's on 4 March 2014, winning 1–0 and Coughlin keeping a clean sheet.

Honours
Wrexham

FA Trophy: 2012–13; runner-up: 2014–15

References

External links

1993 births
Living people
Footballers from Liverpool
English footballers
Association football goalkeepers
Tranmere Rovers F.C. players
Fleetwood Town F.C. players
Wrexham A.F.C. players
Colwyn Bay F.C. players
English Football League players
England semi-pro international footballers
National League (English football) players
Southport F.C. players
Barrow A.F.C. players
Cymru Alliance players
Sportspeople from Bootle
Bangor City F.C. players
Airbus UK Broughton F.C. players